Jan Drago (born May 12, 1940) is an American politician and educator from Seattle who has served on both Seattle City Council and King County Council.

Personal history and education
Prior to her election to Seattle City Council, Drago was schoolteacher (1973–1978) and later the owner of a Häagen-Dazs Ice Cream Shoppes franchise in downtown Seattle (1980-1991). She is a graduate of Douglass College, Rutgers University (B.A., Psychology). She and her husband, Noel, are residents of Seattle's Pioneer Square, a downtown historic district, and have four sons and four grandsons. Her favorite form of relaxation is working her plot in Seattle's Judkins P-Patch.

Seattle City Council and King County Council tenures
From 1994 to 2009, Drago was a member of Seattle City Council.

During that time, she was Council President (1996-1997 and 2004-2005), chair of the Finance and Budget Committee (1999–2003) and chair of the Transportation Committee.
She also served on the Housing and Economic Development Committee, and the Parks and Seattle Center Committee. She represented the Council on the Puget Sound Regional Council and its Transportation Policy Board as well as King County's Regional Transportation Committee, the Trade Development Alliance, the Seattle Convention and Visitors’ Board, PortJobs Board, Seattle-Chongqing Sister Association, Seattle-Taejon Sister City Council, the Sister Cities Coordinating Council, and the Sister City Association.  For eight years, she was a Council representative on the Civic Center Client Group.

On March 1, 2009,  Drago announced her intention to retire from the Seattle City Council and not seek another term.

Drago's lasting impact, as a Seattle elected official, was on transportation. As a councilmember, Drago played a leading role in the success of a mega-project, the deep-bore tunnel under downtown that replaced the Alaskan Way Viaduct; in the transformation of a major arterial—the two-way Mercer Street—that helped develop the South Lake Union neighborhood now home to Amazon headquarters; and the beginning of the Seattle Streetcar network.

On May 26, 2009, Drago declared that she was running for Mayor of Seattle, seeking to unseat two-term Mayor Greg Nickels.  She ultimately finished fifth in the August 2009 primary election and failed to advance to the November general election.

On January 4, 2010, only four days after she had left the Seattle City Council, Drago was appointed to the King County Council, District 8. She filled the seat left vacant by Dow Constantine's election as King County Executive. As a condition of her appointment, she agreed not to seek the post in the November 2010 election.

Civic leadership and volunteer work

Drago was also a board member of the Mountains to Sound Greenway Trust, and was a member of the Seattle Art Museum Executive Board, Downtown Seattle Association, Washington Council on Crime and Delinquency, Denny Regrade Business Association and the Denny Regrade Crime Prevention Council (former president), the National Women's Political Caucus of Washington, and Washington State Democratic Party.  Prior to her election to the City Council, she served as chairperson to Seattle Mayor Charles Royer's Homeless Task Force and vice-chair of Washington Governor Booth Gardner's Task Force on Homelessness. More than 16 years ago, Drago organized the City's Downtown District Council, the first acknowledgment by City Hall that Downtown Seattle was composed of several residential neighborhoods. Drago was one of the original founders of Sustainable Seattle.

References

Living people
Seattle City Council members
King County Councillors
Women city councillors in Washington (state)
20th-century American women politicians
20th-century American politicians
21st-century American women politicians
21st-century American politicians
Rutgers University alumni
1940 births